Elomeryx is an extinct genus of artiodactyl ungulate, and is among the earliest known anthracotheres. The genus was extremely widespread, first being found in Asia in the middle Eocene, in Europe during the latest Eocene, and having spread to North America by the early Oligocene. It is closely related to cows, pigs, deer, cetaceans, and possibly hippopotamuses.
 
It had small tusks which it used to uproot plants, and spoon-shaped incisors ideal for pulling and cropping water plants. Elomeryx had five-toed hind legs and four-toed front legs, resulting in wide feet which made it easier to walk on soft mud. It probably had similar habits to the modern hippopotamus, to which it may have been related.

References

Anthracotheres
Eocene even-toed ungulates
Oligocene even-toed ungulates
Rupelian genus extinctions
Paleogene mammals of North America
Paleogene mammals of Asia
Paleogene mammals of Europe
Fossil taxa described in 1894
Prehistoric even-toed ungulate genera